Colegio Marista San José is a comprehensive school, ages three to eighteen, in León, Spain. It continues to be run by the Marist Brothers who opened it in 1951. 

On October 12, 29 Marist Brothers opened the school to 1106 students. The enrollment capacity in 2015 was given as infant education (225), primary (450), secondary (357), baccalaureate science and technology (198) and humanities and social sciences (140).

References  

Marist Brothers schools
Catholic schools in Spain
Educational institutions established in 1951
1951 establishments in Spain